Simon Casady (July 17, 1908 – March 27, 1995) was a journalist and political figure who was influential in California Democratic Party politics, serving as president of the California Democratic Council. Due to his publishing power in the southwest, he helped launch the political careers of Barry Goldwater, Lyndon Johnson, Senator Lloyd Bentsen, and other politicians. Casady was known for his liberal political positions, including his opposition to the Vietnam War, support for the civil rights movement, environmentalism, and the farm workers' movement, and was known as a frequent defender of Fidel Castro and the Sandinistas. He was the former publisher for El Cajon Valley News (now The Daily Californian) as well as The Arizona Republic and the Phoenix Gazette.

Life and career
Born in Des Moines, Iowa in 1908, Casady was the son of Episcopal Bishop Thomas Casady, grandson of prominent Iowa banker Simon Casady, and great-grandson of Iowa state senator Phineas M. Casady. Casady attended the University of the South in Sewanee Tennessee, the University of Iowa, and the University of Oklahoma. His career in journalism began in 1928, when he worked as a reporter for the Oklahoma City Times. He also worked as a wire editor for the Associated Press.

Due to the editorials he wrote denouncing the Vietnam War, Casady had a lengthy FBI file. His opposition to the Vietnam War was divisive among California Democrats in the 1960s and Casady earned the nickname "Cyanide Si". California Governor Edmund G. (Pat) Brown Sr. ousted Casady from his position as head of the California Democratic Council because of his stance on Vietnam. In 1966, Casady served as co-chairman of the National Conference for New Politics, alongside Julian Bond. Casady also served as president of the San Diego-based Friends of the Black Panthers (F.O.B.P.). Until his expulsion in 1971, Casady worked in Singapore for three years as a consultant during the government of Lee Kuan Yew.

Casady's only attempt at electoral politics was running against Pete Wilson in the 1979 San Diego mayoral election, an election which he lost. His campaign organization was headquartered at the eighteen-room Guymon House, a mansion in the upper class Mission Hills neighborhood of San Diego that was owned by his son Kent and daughter-in-law Janed.

Casady was married to Virginia Kent Boone, a direct descendant of Daniel Boone. Virginia died in 1987. Simon Casady died on April 27th, 1995. He is survived by his children Derek, Kent, Lance, and Cort. His son Mark died in 1994. Kent and his ex-wife Janed Guymon Casady are the parents of the talent manager and producer Guymon Casady.

References

External links
Finding Aid for the Charles G. Gant California Democratic Council Records LSC.1073, Online Archive of California
For the Record, Freedom of Information Act Electronic Reading Room, Central Intelligence Agency

1908 births
1995 deaths
American expatriates in Singapore
American journalists
California Democrats
Casady family
People from Des Moines, Iowa
People from La Jolla, San Diego
University of Iowa alumni
University of Oklahoma alumni
Sewanee: The University of the South alumni